Mining has been conducted on an industrial scale in present-day Canada since the late 18th century. The industry remains an important aspect of the economy of Canada to this day, particularly in the North, and Canadian-domiciled mining companies have increasingly expanded their operations globally.

History 
The history of mining in Canada goes back to the 16th century. In the 1570s, Martin Frobisher briefly attempted a mining operation on Baffin Island, although it was unsuccessful. In 1672, French settlers in Cape Breton Island detected coal deposits. Matonabbee and Samuel Hearne sought after copper in the Hudson Bay region in the 1770s. 

The first truly industrial mining operation in what is now Canada was an iron mine at Forges du Saint-Maurice near Trois-Rivières in Quebec, which remained a going concern from 1738 to 1883. Copper mining in Bruce Mines, Ontario—the first industrial-scale mine of a substance other than iron—followed in 1848. The Canadian mining industry continued to expand nationwide through the 19th century, and became one of the world's largest by the 20th century, particularly following World War II. 

Mills and Sweeney note that the staples thesis, which posits that the Canadian economy has developed primarily through the exploitation of the country's abundant natural resources, remains a viable model of Canadian political economy.

Operations 
In 2019, Canada was the 4th largest  producer of platinum; the world's 5th largest producer of gold; the world's 5th largest producer of nickel; the world's 10th largest producer of copper; the 8th largest world producer of iron ore; the 4th largest world producer of titanium; the world's largest producer of potash; the 2nd largest world producer of niobium; the 4th largest world producer of sulfur; the world's 7th largest producer of molybdenum; the 7th worldwide producer of cobalt; the 8th largest world producer of lithium; the 8th largest world producer of zinc; the 13th largest world producer of gypsum; the 14th worldwide producer of antimony; the world's 10th largest producer of graphite; in addition to being the 6th largest world producer of  salt.  It was the 2nd largest producer in the world of uranium in 2018.

Economic impact

Domestic 
Mining is a significant part of the economy of Canada. , mining revenues totalled  billion. Approximately 75 percent of the world's mining companies are headquartered in Canada, and 60 percent are listed on the Toronto Stock Exchange. Toronto is a financial centre for the mining industry: as of 2016, around 80 percent of the world's equity trades in mining stocks took place in Toronto's markets. 

The Canadian mining industry has experienced significant volatility in recent history. The 1980s and 1990s saw a "prolonged slump" in Canadian mining, whereas the 2000s and 2010s were largely boom periods.

Saskatchewan alone produces approximately 15 percent of the world's uranium. The metal was first discovered in the province in the 1930s, and had become Canada's most valuable resource export by the 1950s. In Northern Canada, mining—particularly hardrock mining—has long been one of the most significant sources of economic development.

Canada taxes mining companies at a relatively low level by international standards. Alam identifies this as one way Canada has established itself an attractive place for mining companies to do business.

International 
International expansion of the domestic mining industry has been championed by the government of Canada, and one scholar describes Canadian mining operations as having "developed an extensive and indeed dominant global presence". Canadian mining investment abroad has been particularly significant in Latin America and African countries.

See also 
 Coal mining in Saskatchewan
 Lists of mines in Canada
 Uranium mining in Canada
 Canadian mining in Latin America and the Caribbean

References

Sources 
 

 
 

 

Economy of Canada